The North East Business Summit is an annual flagship event to promote investment and business opportunities in the North Eastern part of India. The event is jointly organized by the Ministry of Development of North Eastern Region, Government of India and the Indian Chamber of Commerce. The event was organized for the first time in 2002 in Mumbai and over the course of next eleven years till November, 2013, nine editions of this  business event have been organized.

North East Business Summits

References 

Business conferences in India